Australasian Business Intelligence is an Australian business service, database and journal, providing information on international business. It was established on 1 April 1993, and is owned by LexisNexis. It appears three times a year, and the headquarters is in South Yarra, Victoria. Some large libraries– subscribe to the Australasian Business Intelligence.

References

External links
 Official website
 WorldCat record
Articles on Highbeam.com

1993 establishments in Australia
Business magazines published in Australia
Magazines established in 1993
Triannual magazines
Mass media in Victoria (Australia)